Josephine Sinyo is a Kenyan lawyer, politician and disability rights activist. She is a member of Kenya's parliament, having become in 1998 the country's first blind person to be elected an MP.

Early life and education
Josephine Sinyo is blind since having measles when she was three years old. She studied for her bachelors (LLB) at the University of Nairobi and a masters (LLM) at the University of Hull in England.

Career
Experiences she had after giving birth to a child pushed her towards disability rights activism and she became chief executive officer of the Kenya Law Reform Commission (KLRC). She is also a trustee of the National Fund for People with a Disability.

In 1998, she was nominated for member of parliament by the Safina Party and was elected, becoming Kenya's first blind person to be an MP. She has also worked at the High Court of Kenya and the attorney general's office. A former MP, Dt Oki Ooko Ombaka]] had become blind during his service.

Awards and recognition 
Sinyo has received a number of state awards including the Order of the Grand Warrior (OGW) of Kenya (2006), the Excellence Service Award (2015) and the Elder of the Burning Spear (2017).

Publications
 Environmental Law and Women, 1993

See also 
 List of first women lawyers and judges in Africa

References 

20th-century Kenyan lawyers
University of Nairobi alumni
Kenyan women activists
Kenyan women lawyers
Kenyan women in politics
Kenyan people with disabilities
Safina politicians
Blind politicians
Alumni of the University of Hull
Living people
Year of birth missing (living people)